El Protector is an annual lucha libre tournament held by the Mexican professional wrestling promotion International Wrestling Revolution Group (IWRG) in January of each year. The El Protector tournament started in 2012 but was preceded in 2010 and 2011 by the Torneo Relampago de Proyeccion a Nuevas Promesas de la Lucha Libre ("Projecting a new promise lightning tournament"), a tournament with the same format and concept. The concept of the tournament is to team a young up-and-comer with a veteran and use the tournament to help showcase the younger talent, the young winner is often someone IWRG has plans for, although at times it has not always had the desired result. The tournament has always been held in Arena Naucalpan in Naucalpan, State of Mexico, the main arena of IWRG. A total of 66 different wrestlers have competed in the seven tournaments held so far with Veneno being the only wrestler to compete in all seven. Alan Extreme, Eterno and Trauma I are the only three wrestlers to compete both as a rookie and as a veteran in the tournament. X-Fly is the only wrestler to win the tournament twice, winning the 2012 tournament and the 2013 tournament as a veteran.

List of El Protector winners

Dates, venues and main events

References

External links